Windsor Protocol is a 1997 British-Canadian television thriller film directed by George Mihalka and starring Kyle MacLachlan. It is "inspired by the characters created by Jack Higgins", particularly Sean Dillon. The Windsor Protocol is a list created by Adolf Hitler that will help revive the Nazi party; Dillon must find it before it falls into the wrong hands.

Cast
 Kyle MacLachlan as Sean Dillon
 Macha Grenon as Catherine
 Chris Wiggins as Sir Charles Ferguson
 Lisa Bronwyn Moore as Lenny
 John Colicos as Gerhardt Heinzer / Albert Greenfield
 Eugene Clark as Vice President Anson Powers

Production
It was followed by Thunder Point (1998), also starring Kyle MacLachlan as Sean Dillon and Chris Wiggins as Sir Charles Ferguson.

External links 

1996 films
Films based on British novels
1990s English-language films
English-language Canadian films
British television films
1990s thriller films
Films directed by George Mihalka
Spy television films
Canadian thriller television films
1990s Canadian films